Marie Parent (1853–1934) was a Belgian journal editor, temperance activist, feminist and suffragist. She founded the Alliance des femmes contre les abus de l'alcool (Alliance of Women against Alcohol Abuse) in 1905 and the Ligue belge des femmes rationalistes (Belgian League of Rationalist Women) in 1920. For over 20 years, she headed and edited the Journal des Mères (Mothers' Journal), for which she received the Adelson Castiau award from the Royal Academy of Belgium and a gold medal at the 1910 Brussels International Exhibition.

Biography
Born on 20 December 1853 in Brussels, Marie Parent was the seventh and last child of Jean-Jacques Florimond Parent, a printer and publisher, and Marie de Vogelsang, who took over her husband's business when he died.

The following year, she embarked on her temperance campaign, publishing a brochure titled  (The Woman's Role in the Fight against Alcoholism), advising working-class women of their rights when faced with violence from their husbands.

Parent was one of the delegates at the Inter-Allied Women's Conference held in Paris from 10 February 1919 to develop women's topics for the Paris Peace Conference.

Marie Parent died in 1934.

References

Activists from Brussels
1853 births
1934 deaths
Belgian feminists
Belgian suffragists
Belgian pacifists
Belgian editors
Belgian magazine editors
Women magazine editors
Belgian women writers